Hans Cranach (ca. 1513–1537), also known as Johann Lucas Cranach, was a German painter, the oldest son of Lucas Cranach the Elder. German art historian Johann Christian Schuchardt, who discovered his existence, credits him with an altar-piece at Weimar, signed with the monogram "H. C.", and dated 1537. He died at Bologna in 1537. Luther mentions his death in his Table Talk, and Johann Stigel, a contemporary poet, celebrates him as a painter.

References
 

Year of birth unknown
1537 deaths
German Renaissance painters
Year of birth uncertain
Cranach family